Fredrik Svensson (born 10 September 1973) is a Swedish race walker.

Achievements

References

1973 births
Living people
Swedish male racewalkers